Foley House is a Grade II listed building at 28 Worcester Road, Malvern, Worcestershire, England.

The two-storey house was created in the early to mid nineteenth century. It has rendered walls and a slate roof.

A blue plaque on the house commemorates the fact that, from 1936 to 1952, it was occupied by the Lanchester Marionettes theatre company.

The building was given "Grade II listed" protection in November 1949. It was as recently as 2015 an antiques centre, however is currently vacant.

References

External links 

 

Theatres in Worcestershire
Grade II listed buildings in Worcestershire
Grade II listed houses
Houses in Worcestershire
Buildings and structures in Malvern, Worcestershire